Sir Richard Maitland of Lethington and Thirlstane (1496 – 1 August 1586) was a Senator of the College of Justice, an Ordinary Lord of Session from 1561 until 1584, and notable Scottish poet. He was served heir to his father, Sir William Maitland of Lethington, East Lothian, and Thirlestane, Berwickshire, on 15 October 1515, his father being one of the casualties at the Battle of Flodden. He held the political office of Keeper of the Great Seal of Scotland and was also the Keeper of the Privy Seal of Scotland, from 1563 to 1567, and was succeeded in this post by his son Sir John Maitland, 1st Lord Maitland of Thirlestane.

He married Mariotta (or Margaret) (d. March 1586), daughter of Sir Thomas Cranstoun of Corsbie, in Berwickshire. They had three sons and four daughters, including

 William Maitland of Lethington, Secretary of State to Mary, Queen of Scots, and
 Sir John Maitland of Thirlestane, Lord Chancellor of Scotland; 
 Thomas Maitland;
 Isabella Maitland, who married Sir James Heriot of Traboun
 Mary (d. January 1596), who married Alexander Lauder of Haltoun (d. 1627).
 Elizabeth, who married William Douglas of Whittinghame.
 Helen Maitland, who married John Cockburn of Clerkington, and was the mother of Richard Cockburn of Clerkington

The Maitland Manuscripts

Two of Maitland's manuscript works survive; both are compilations of the Scots literature of his era. They preserve many of the works of the great makars and a large number of anonymous pieces. The manuscripts also record many of Maitland's own compositions. Maitland's daughter Mary transcribed his poems as well as her brother John Maitland's and others.

The Maitland Manuscripts are held by the Pepys Library.

References

Other sources
 Miscellanea Genealogica et Heraldica, edited by Joseph Jackson Howard, LL.D.,F.S.A., vol. 2, London, 1876, p. 206, where his date of death is given as 1 August 1586.
 The Genealogy of the House and Surname of Setoun, by Sir Richard Maitland of Lethington, Knight, March 1561, with the Chronicle of the House of Setoun compiled in metre (prose) by John Kamington alias Peter Manye, printed at Edinburgh, October 1830.
 The Register of the Privy Council of Scotland, Second Series, edited by P.Hume Brown, M.A., LLD., Edinburgh, 1900, vol.2, 1627–1628, p. 117.
 Maitland, Richard, The History of the House of Seytoun to 1559 by Sir Richard Maitland of Lethington continued by Alexnder Viscount Kingston, Maitland Club (1829)
  "A Biographical Dictionary of Eminent Scotsmen: Hamilton, William-M'Gavin" By Robert Chambers, Thomas Thomson

 

1496 births
1586 deaths
Court of Mary, Queen of Scots
People from East Lothian
Scottish knights
Scottish lawyers
Scots Makars
Scottish male poets
Keepers of the Great Seal of Scotland
16th-century Scottish historians
16th-century Scottish poets
Scottish Renaissance writers
Extraordinary Lords of Session